Ice XIX is a proposed crystalline phase of water. Along with ice XV, it is one of two phases of ice directly related to ice VI. Ice XIX is prepared by cooling HCl-doped ice VI at a pressure above 1.6 GPa down to about 100 K. As of 2022, its crystal structure has not been elucidated.

Discovery

Initial report 

The first report regarding ice XIX was published in 2018 by Thomas Loering's group from Austria. They quenched HCl-doped ice VI to 77 K at different pressures between 1.0 and 1.8 GPa to collect differential scanning calorimetry (DSC) thermograms, dielectric spectrum, Raman spectrum, and X-ray diffraction patterns. In the DSC signals, there was an endothermic feature at about 110 K in addition to the endotherm corresponding to ice XV-VI transition. Additionally, the Raman spectra, dielectric properties, and the ratio of the lattice parameters differed from those of ice XV. Based on these observations, they proposed the existence of a second hydrogen-ordered phase of ice VI, naming it ice beta-XV.

Alternative explanation 

In 2019, Alexander Rosu-Finsen and Christoph Salzman argued that there was no need to consider this to be new phase of ice, and proposed a "deep-glassy" state scenario. According to their DSC data, the size of the endothermic feature depends not only on quench-recovery pressure but also on the heating rate and annealing duration at 93 K. They also collected neutron diffraction profiles of quench-recovered deuterium chloride-doped, D2O ice VI/XV prepared at different pressures of 1.0, 1.4 and 1.8 GPa, to show that there were no significant differences among them. They concluded that the low-temperature endotherm originated from kinetic features related to glass transitions of deep glassy states of disordered ice VI.

Further exploration 

Distinguishing between the two scenarios (new hydrogen-ordered phase vs. deep-glassy disordered ice VI) became an open question and the debate between the two groups has continued. Thoeny et al. (Loerting's group)  collected another series of Raman spectra of ice beta-XV, and reported that (i) ice XV prepared by the protocol reported previously contains both ice XV and ice beta-XV domains; (ii) upon heating, Raman spectra of ice beta-XV showed loss of H-order. 

In contrast, Salzmann's group again argued for the plausibility of a 'deep-glassy state' scenario based on neutron diffraction and neutron inelastic scattering experiments. Based on their experimental results, ice VI and deep-glassy ice VI share very similar features based on both elastic (diffraction) scattering and inelastic scattering experiments, and are clearly different from the properties of ice XV.

In 2021, further crystallographic evidence for a new phase (ice XIX) was individually reported by three groups: Yamane et al. (Hiroyuki Kagi and Kazuki Komatsu's group from Japan), Gasser et al. (Loerting's group), and Salzmann's group. Yamane et al.  collected neutron diffraction profiles in situ (i.e. under high pressure) and found new Bragg features  completely different from both ice VI and ice XV. They performed Rietveld refinement of the profiles based on the  supercell of ice XV and proposed some leading candidates for the space group of ice XIX: P-4, Pca21, Pcc2, P21/a, and P21/c. They also measured dielectric spectra in situ and determined phase boundaries of ices VI/XV/XIX. They found that the sign of the slope of the boundary turns negative from positive at 1.6 GPa indicating the existence of two different phases by the Clausis-Clapeyron relation. 

Gasser et al.  also collected powder neutron diffractograms of quench-recovered ices VI, XV, and XIX and found similar crystallographic features to those reported by Yamane et al., concluding that P-4 and Pcc2 are the plausible space group candidates. Both Yamane et al.'s and Gasser et al.'s results suggested a partially hydrogen-ordered structure. Gasser et al. also found an isotope effect using DSC; the low-temperature endotherm for DCl-doped D2O ice XIX was significantly smaller than that of HCl-doped H2O ice XIX, and that a doping of 0.5% of H2O into D2O is sufficient for the ordering transition. 

Several months later, Salzmann et al. published a paper based on in-situ powder neutron diffraction experiments of ice XIX. In a change from their previous reports, they accepted the idea of the new phase (ice XIX) as they observed similar features to the previous two reports. However, they refined their diffraction profiles based on a disordered structural model (Pbcn) and argued that new Bragg reflections can be explained by distortions of ice VI, so that ice XIX may still be regarded as a deep-glassy state of ice VI. 

The crystal structure of ice XIX including hydrogen order/disorder is still under debate as of 2022.

References 

Ice